The R539 is a Regional Route in Mpumalanga, South Africa. It connects the R36 between Waterval Boven and Mashishing (Lydenburg) with the R37 between Sabie and Nelspruit.

Route
Its western origin is the R36 between Waterval Boven and Mashishing (Lydenburg), at the Chom se Hoogte Pass. It runs east through De Beersnek Pass, Patatanek, and Schoemanskloof pass to join the N4. The R539 is cosigned with the N4 through the Montrose pass, but it leaves the N4 on the eastern side, heading north-east to end at the R37 between Sabie and Nelspruit.

References

Regional Routes in Mpumalanga